Roger Felix Turner (March 3, 1901 – October 29, 1993) was an American figure skater.

He was born in Milton, Massachusetts and died in Walpole, Massachusetts.

Turner was the seven time (1928–1934) U.S. National Champion and two time (1930–1931) World silver medalist. He is tied with Dick Button for having the most consecutive wins at the U.S. Championships (men's singles). Turner was inducted into the United States Figure Skating Hall of Fame in 1994. He was a member of the Skating Club of Boston.

At the 1928 Winter Olympics he finished tenth in the singles competition. Four years later at the Lake Placid Games he finished sixth in the singles event.

Results

Men's singles

Pairs
(with Polly Blodgett)

References
 Sports-Reference Profile
  
 Hall of Fame Inductees

1901 births
1993 deaths
American male single skaters
Olympic figure skaters of the United States
Figure skaters at the 1928 Winter Olympics
Figure skaters at the 1932 Winter Olympics
People from Milton, Massachusetts
People from Walpole, Massachusetts
World Figure Skating Championships medalists